Port Island is an island located between Gdańsk Bay, Śmiała Wisła and Leniwka in northern Poland within the city limits of Gdańsk.

Administration
The island is divided into 3 administrative quarters:
Stogi, population 9,832, area 10.9 km2, density 901
Przeróbka, population 3,750, area 6.9 km2, density 545
Krakowiec-Górki Zachodnie, population 1,735, area 8.3 km2, density 208
Total: population 15,317, area 26,2 km2 (2021)

Industry 
Industrial facilities of national importance are located on the island, incl. the Gdańsk refinery and Port Północny (Northern Port) with the Deepwater Container Terminal Gdańsk (part of the Port of Gdańsk).

Sightseeing 
 Wisłoujście Fortress, historic fortress dating back to the 15th century, that used to guard the mouth of the Port of Gdańsk, listed as a Historic Monument of Poland.
 Westerplatte, the place of the Battle of Westerplatte, the first battle of the German invasion of Poland and World War II, now a memorial and museum complex, listed as a Historic Monument of Poland.

See also
List of islands of Poland

References

External links 
 Podział administracyjny Gdańska

Gdańsk
Islands of Poland
Landforms of Pomeranian Voivodeship